Adinath (IAST: Ādinātha) is a Sanskrit word meaning "First Lord" and can refer to:

People 
 Ādinātha, an alternative name for the first Tirthankara of Jainism, Rishabhanatha.
 Adinath Kothare, an actor, director, and producer
 Adinath Lahiri, geochemist
 Vilas Adinath Sangave, sociologist and Jainologist
 Vinayak Adinath Buwa, author

Religion 
 Adinath Lokeshwar, a Hindu and Buddhist temple in Nepal
 Adinath Sampradaya, a sadhu sub-sect of the Nath Sampradaya
 Adinath Shiva, god
 Adinath Temple, a temple in Bangladesh dedicated to Shiva
 Adinatha temple, Khajuraho, a Jain temple in India
 Adinatha temple, Ranakpur, a Jain temple in Ranakpur, India
 Shri Adinath Akhara, an ashram dedicated to Shiva in Buxar District, Bihar, India